Sri Vasavi Engineering College is an educational institution in Tadepalligudem, Andhra Pradesh, India. It is affiliated to Jawaharlal Nehru Technological University, Kakinada, A.P. and is approved by All India Council for Technical Education (AICTE), New Delhi and also accredited by NBA. The college has a campus of  25 acres located at Pedatadepalli, 5 km from town of Tadepalligudem.

Now, it also acts as temporary campus for National Institute of Technology, Andhra Pradesh situated in Tadepalligudem.

Admissions
Admissions are made on par with other Colleges of Engineering and Technology in the State of Andhra Pradesh through the Common Entrance Test EAPCET conducted by the state government. While 70% of the seats allotted are based on merit in EAPCET, 30% of the seats are earmarked for Management Quota.

Academics
The B.tech Programs offered are:

Mechanical engineering
Computer Science and Engineering
Civil Engineering
Electronics and Communication Engineering
Electrical and Electronics Engineering
Computer Science and Technology

References

External links
 Official Website

Engineering colleges in Andhra Pradesh
Universities and colleges in West Godavari district
Educational institutions established in 2001
2001 establishments in Andhra Pradesh